Bodie (born 1951) and Brock Thoene (born 1952; pronounced Tay-nee) are an American husband-and-wife duo of authors. They are the authors of more than 75 works of historical fiction. Eight of their books have won Gold Medallion Awards.
Over 35 million copies of their books have been sold in more than 20 languages.

Career
Bodie has written articles appearing in The Saturday Evening Post, U.S. News & World Report, and The American West. In the 1970s, she also worked as a screenwriter for John Wayne's production company Batjac Productions and co-wrote Fall Guy with Wayne's stunt double Charles H. Roberson. Bodie has also worked with ABC Circle Films as a writer and researcher. The couple works as a writing team with Brock as the researcher and story-line consultant and Bodie as co-author.

Personal life
Born in Bakersfield, California, the couple first met each other when they were three years old. They were married as college sophomores in 1970 and have four adult children, Luke, Jake, Rachel and Ellie Thoene who are also authors. They are also grandparents to nine grandchildren. Bodie holds a PhD in creative writing and also holds degree in journalism and communications  and Brock holds a PhD in history and a master's degree in education. They divide their time between London, Nevada, Hawaii and Central California.

Published works

The Zion Diaries series
 The Gathering Storm
 Against the Wind (pending publication 2011)
 Their Finest Hour (never published)

A.D. Chronicles series
 First Light
 Second Touch
 Third Watch
 Fourth Dawn
 Fifth Seal
 Sixth Covenant
 Seventh Day
 Eighth Shepherd
 Ninth Witness
 Tenth Stone
 Eleventh Guest
 Twelfth Prophecy

Zion Covenant series
 Vienna Prelude
 Prague Counterpoint
 Munich Signature
 Jerusalem Interlude
 Danzig Passage
 Warsaw Requiem
 London Refrain
 Paris Encore
 Dunkirk Crescendo

Zion Chronicles series
 The Gates of Zion
 A Daughter of Zion
 The Return to Zion
 A Light in Zion
 The Key to Zion

Shiloh Legacy series
 In My Father's House
 A Thousand Shall Fall
 Say to This Mountain
 Shiloh Autumn

Galway Chronicles series
 Only the River Runs Free
 Of Men and of Angels
 Ashes of Remembrance
 All Rivers to the Sea

Zion Legacy series
 Jerusalem Vigil
 Thunder from Jerusalem
 Jerusalem's Heart
 Jerusalem Scrolls
 Stones of Jerusalem
 Jerusalem's Hope

The Saga Of The Sierras
 The Man from Shadow Ridge
 Riders of the Silver Rim
 Gold Rush Prodigal
 Sequoia Scout
 Cannons of the Comstock
 Year of the Grizzly
 Shooting Star
 Delta Passage (aka Winds of Promise)
 Hangtown Lawman (aka To Gather the Wind)
 Cumberland Crossing (aka Winds of the Cumberland)

Wayward Wind series
 Winds of Promise
 To Gather the Wind
 Winds of the Cumberland

The Little Books of Why
 Why a Manger?
 Why a Shepherd?
 Why a Star?
 Why a Crown?

Other novels
 Legend of Storey County
 Hope Valley War
 Shiloh Autumn Which follows the story on from the 'Shiloh Legacy' series.
 Twilight of Courage
 Icon Hard Back and (e-book) 
 Love Finds You In Lahaina
 When Jesus Wept - The first in the three-book series "The Jerusalem Chronicles" book 2"Take this Cup" book 3"Behold The Man"

Non-fiction
 Writer to Writer
 Protecting Your Income and Your Family's Future

References

External links
 Official web site of Bodie and Brock Thoene

20th-century American novelists
21st-century American novelists
American historical novelists
Christian novelists
Living people
Writers from Bakersfield, California
1952 births
1951 births
Writers from California
Married couples
American women novelists
20th-century American women writers
21st-century American women writers
Women historical novelists